The Kazan Art School is a state autonomous education institution in Kazan, Republic of Tatarstan.  It's one of the oldest art schools in Russia, with a continuous history of more than 100 years.

History 

The school was founded in 1895 as a branch of the Imperial Academy of Arts.  In its early years, it had four departments:  painting, engraving, architecture, and sculpture.  Early graduates included P.P. Benkov, Alexander Grigoriev and Nicolai Fechin, for whom the school is now named.  Architect Carl Myufke headed the architecture department, designed the grand school building completed in 1904, and served as director until 1908.

In 1918 the Kazan Art School was transformed into Kazan Free Art Studios, then in 1921 because officially known as the Kazan Art and Technical Institute.  In these years the school was the basis for a series of several well-known Kazan artists groups:  "The Sunflower" (1918) which combined the aesthetics of modernism to avant-garde trends; "Rider" (1920-1924) which announced the development of engraving as an independent art; "Tatar Left Front of Art" (TatLEF) (1923-1926); the "Declaration of Five" (1927); and the "Tatar Association of Artists of Revolutionary Russia "(TatAHRR) (1928), the regional branch of the national AKhRR socialist realism association.

The school remained open through the war years, and continues to provide high-level arts education and training.

References 

Educational institutions established in 1895
Education in Kazan
Art schools in Russia
1895 establishments in the Russian Empire